Freethought is a philosophical viewpoint that holds opinions should be formed on the basis of logic, reason, and empiricism. It may also refer to:

Organizations 

 De Vrije Gedachte, the Dutch freethinkers association "The Free Thought"

Publications 

 The Free Thought — a Ukrainian language newspaper published in Australia
The Freethinker (journal), the oldest surviving secularist publication in the world, first published in 1881
The Freethinker (newspaper), a Whig newspaper founded in 1718 by Ambrose Philips and Hugh Boulter
The Freethinker (film), a 1994 film by Peter Watkins.
Free Thinker (book), a 2016 poetry book by Alan Kimble (pen name of comedian Chris Strait)